Nils Sture Larsson (born 14 December 1919) is a Swedish former footballer and bandy player. Larsson made 37 Allsvenskan appearances for Djurgården and scored 12 goals.

Larsson represented Djurgårdens IF Bandy in the 1940 and 1941 seasons.

References

1919 births
Swedish footballers
Djurgårdens IF Fotboll players
Swedish bandy players
Djurgårdens IF Bandy players
Association footballers not categorized by position